Zagheh-ye Olya (also Romanized as Zāgheh-ye ‘Olyā; also known as Zāgheh and Zāgheh-ye Bālā) is a village in Kowleh Rural District, Saral District, Divandarreh County, Kurdistan Province, Iran. At the 2006 census, its population was 496, in 123 families. The village is populated by Kurds.

References 

Towns and villages in Divandarreh County
Kurdish settlements in Kurdistan Province